Mohammad Reza Akhlaghpasand (born 12 December 1978 in Rasht) also known as Shahin Akhlaghpasand is an Iranian table tennis player.

References
 

Table tennis players at the 2004 Summer Olympics
Iranian male table tennis players
1978 births
Living people
Olympic table tennis players of Iran
Table tennis players at the 1998 Asian Games
Table tennis players at the 2010 Asian Games
Asian Games competitors for Iran
People from Rasht
Sportspeople from Gilan province
Islamic Solidarity Games competitors for Iran